Epaltes is a genus of flowering plants in the daisy family. They are distributed in Australia, the Americas, Asia, and Africa.

These plants are annual or perennial herbs or shrubs with alternately arranged leaves.

Species

Epaltes australis Less. — China, Indian Subcontinent, Indochina, Australia
Epaltes cunninghamii (Hook.) Benth. — Australia
Epaltes divaricata (L.) Cass. — India, Sri Lanka, Myanmar, Thailand, Vietnam, Hainan, Java
Epaltes harrisii F.Muell. — Australia
Epaltes madagascariensis Humbert — Madagascar
Epaltes mattfeldii Urb. — Cuba
Epaltes mexicana Less.	— Veracruz, Guatemala, Tabasco, Oaxaca, Chiapas, Campeche	
Epaltes pleiochaeta F.Muell. — Australia
Epaltes pygmaea DC. — Karnataka, Tamil Nadu

References

Inuleae
Asteraceae genera